Fumihiro (written: 文尋, 郁洋, 史弘 or 史浩) is a masculine Japanese given name. Notable people with the name include:

, Japanese politician
, Japanese religious leader and member of Aum Shinrikyo
, Japanese figure skater and journalist
, Japanese baseball player
Fumihiro Okabayashi (岡林史泰, born 1978), Japanese voice actor in "Call of Duty"
Fumihiro Hayashi (林史泰, born 1964), Japanese actor in "Lost in Translation"
Fumihiro Kato (카토郁洋, unknown birth date), Japanese Oil-Artist.

Japanese masculine given names